Penza (Pönza) is a rural locality (a village) in Durasovsky Selsoviet, Chishminsky District, Bashkortostan, Russia. The population was 133 as of 2010. There is 1 street.

Geography 
Penza is located 25 km southwest of Chishmy (the district's administrative centre) by road. Bikkulovo is the nearest rural locality.

References 

Rural localities in Chishminsky District